This page lists public opinion polls conducted for the 2024 Indonesian legislative election, which will be held on or before 28 February 2024.

Opinion polls

Polling graph 
This graph shows the polling trends in the run-up to the 2024 Indonesian legislative election. Scenario polls are not included.

The electoral threshold to obtain seats is currently set at 4%.

2023

2022

2021

2020

See also 
 Opinion polling for the 2024 Indonesian presidential election

References 

Indonesia